The South East Melbourne Phoenix are an Australian professional basketball team based in Melbourne, Victoria. The Phoenix entered the National Basketball League (NBL) in the 2019–20 season. The team play the majority of their home games at John Cain Arena, which they share with fellow NBL team Melbourne United, with some games being played at the State Basketball Centre.

Franchise history
With plans to expand the National Basketball League (NBL) beginning with the 2019–20 season, the league sold a franchise licence to Swansea City co-owner Romie Chaudhari in July 2018. In August 2018, former Melbourne Tigers player Tommy Greer was appointed general manager of the new franchise, with this appointment at the time indicating the franchise would likely be Melbourne-based. On 2 September 2018, the NBL announced that the league's ninth franchise for the 2019–20 season will be based in south-eastern Melbourne. On 18 October 2018, Simon Mitchell was appointed as the inaugural head coach of the team. On 17 November 2018, the team's name was announced as South East Melbourne Phoenix. The team logo and colours were also revealed. On 4 December 2018, former Adelaide 36ers forward Mitch Creek was announced as the team's first marquee signing.

First Season (2019–20)
The Phoenix debuted in the 2019–20 season opener on 3 October 2019, when they were hosted by cross-town rivals Melbourne United at Melbourne Arena. In front of a sold-out crowd of 10,300, the Phoenix won 91–88. The Phoenix played their first home game at Melbourne Arena on 13 October 2019 against the Brisbane Bullets, winning 113–93. The crowd of 6,019 was the highest recorded for an expansion franchise's first home game in league history. Despite losing import forward Tai Wesley to injury on opening night, the Phoenix sat in second place with a 5–2 record after the season's first six rounds. From that point, however, they won just four more games to finish their inaugural season in eighth place with a 9–19 record. The Phoenix averaged the highest crowd figures ever for a first year start-up club in Australian Basketball, with a total of 75,179 fans attending their fourteen home games at an average of 5,369 fans per game.

Home arena

The Phoenix are headquartered and train at the State Basketball Centre, located in Wantirna South, part of the South-Eastern City of Knox region that forms part of the club's strategic engagement area. The Phoenix play most of their home games at John Cain Arena, which is known as "The Fire Pit" during Phoenix Games. The Phoenix also play a select number of regular season games at the State Basketball Centre each season. During the 2020–21 NBL season, COVID-19 border closures meant that the Phoenix had to relocate their last two home games against the Cairns Taipans and Brisbane Bullets to Cairns Pop-Up Arena. They also hosted their semi-final home game at Qudos Bank Arena in Sydney.

On 25 January 2022, the Phoenix played a regular season game against the Cairns Taipans at the Gippsland Regional Indoor Sports Stadium (GRISS) in Traralgon. The Phoenix played another game at GRISS in the 2022–23 NBL season against the Sydney Kings.

 John Cain Arena (2019–present)
 State Basketball Centre (2020–present)
 Cairns Pop-Up Arena (2021)
 Qudos Bank Arena (2021)
 Gippsland Regional Indoor Sports Stadium (2022–present)

Players

All-time roster

Current roster

Notable players

 / Deng Acuoth
  Keith Benson
  Ryan Broekhoff
  Mitch Creek
  Adam Gibson
  Cameron Gliddon
 / Trey Kell
  Izayah Le'afa
 / Junior Madut
  Ben Moore
  Xavier Munford
  Tohi Smith-Milner
  Keifer Sykes
  Reuben Te Rangi
  Tai Wesley
  Alan Williams
  Zhou Qi

Honour roll

Season by season

References

External links 

 

 
Basketball teams in Melbourne
National Basketball League (Australia) teams
2018 establishments in Australia
Basketball teams established in 2018
Sport in the City of Knox